Lähteenmäki is a Finnish surname.

Geographical distribution
As of 2014, 96.6% of all known bearers of the surname Lähteenmäki were residents of Finland (frequency 1:1,649), 1.9% of Estonia (1:20,333) and 1.3% of Sweden (1:218,817).

In Finland, the frequency of the surname was higher than national average (1:1,649) in the following regions:
 1. Satakunta (1:376)
 2. Pirkanmaa (1:545)
 3. Southwest Finland (1:1,033)
 4. Tavastia Proper (1:1,071)
 5. Central Finland (1:1,504)

People
 Maija Lähteenmäki, Finnish diplomat
 Maria Lähteenmäki (born 1957), Finnish historian
 Sami Lähteenmäki (born 1989), Finnish ice hockey player
 Krista Pärmäkoski (born 1990), Finnish cross country skier, née Lähteenmäki

References

Finnish-language surnames
Surnames of Finnish origin